Airoli is a railway station on the Harbour line of the Mumbai Suburban Railway network located at the Navi Mumbai node of Airoli.

Airoli is the first railway station 5.79 km away from Thane railway station on Thane–Turbhe–Nerul/Vashi/Panvel line. It takes about 8 minutes to reach Thane from Airoli by train. The railway station is located in Sector 3 of Airoli Node abutting the Thane–Belapur road. It is designed to cater to passenger traffic demand originating from Thane–Belapur industrial zone, on the east side and residential and commercial zone of Airoli on the west. Airoli station is transition station between Mumbai and Navi Mumbai. 

There are 2 platforms (1st platform is for trains coming from Thane to Vashi/Nerul/Belapur/Panvel and 2nd platform is for trains coming from Vashi/Nerul/Belapur/Panvel to Thane) with a length of 210 metres (the length is being extended). The platforms would be extended by 60 metres in future. There are two commuter and one light motor vehicle subway. There is a train every 8 minutes for Thane and Vashi/Panvel/Nerul from Airoli Station. The Thane–Belapur station has only two frequency (one in morning and one in evening).

See also
Mumbai Suburban Railway 
Harbour Line

References

Railway stations in Thane district
Mumbai Suburban Railway stations
Mumbai CR railway division